Orange Street School is a historic school building located at Fayetteville, Cumberland County, North Carolina.  It was built about 1915 for African-American students, and is a two-story, approximately square brick building, three bays wide and three bays deep, with Neoclassical style detailing.  It was the original home of E. E. Smith High School from 1927 to 1929 and 1931 to 1940.

It was listed on the National Register of Historic Places in 1987.

References

African-American history of North Carolina
School buildings on the National Register of Historic Places in North Carolina
Neoclassical architecture in North Carolina
School buildings completed in 1915
Buildings and structures in Fayetteville, North Carolina
National Register of Historic Places in Cumberland County, North Carolina
1915 establishments in North Carolina